Bhonsle (or variants Bhonsale, Bhosale, Bhosle, Bhonsla) are a group within the Maratha clan system.

Bhonsle may also refer to:

 Anubha Bhonsle, Indian TV and print journalist, author
 Nagesh Bhonsle (also Bhosle or Bhosale), Indian film, television and theatre actor
 Digvijay Bhonsale (born 1989), Indian Rock/Metal singer, guitarist and songwriter
 Bhonsle (film), an Indian Hindi-language drama film

See also 
 Bhonsle kingdom, also known as Nagpur kingdom
 Bhosle (disambiguation)
 Bhosale (disambiguation)